The 2015 EuroChallenge Final Four was the concluding tournament of the 2014–15 EuroChallenge season. The tournament was held in the Hayri Gür Arena in Trabzon, home of Trabzonspor Medical Park, one of the semifinalists. JSF Nanterre took the title, after beating hosts Trabzonspor 63–64 in the Final. Energia Târgu Jiu took third place, while Fraport Skyliners finished fourth.

Bracket

Semifinals

Semifinal 1

Semifinal 2

Third place game
Giordan Watson hit a crucial three-point field goal with less than two seconds to go, to lead Energia to the win.

Final
The game was won by JSF Nanterre on a buzzer-beating lay-up from Terrance Campbell, that was reviewed by using instant replay.

References

Final four
FIBA EuroChallenge Final Fours
2014–15 in Turkish basketball
2014–15 in German basketball
2014–15 in French basketball
2014–15 in Romanian basketball
International basketball competitions hosted by Turkey
Sport in Trabzon